The 2020 Basque regional election was held on Sunday, 12 July 2020, to elect the 12th Parliament of the Basque Autonomous Community. All 75 seats in the Parliament were up for election. The election was initially scheduled for 5 April 2020 but was postponed as a result of the COVID-19 pandemic. It was held simultaneously with a regional election in Galicia.

On 4 February 2020, Lehendakari Iñigo Urkullu had discussed holding a snap election within a cabinet meeting, fulfilling a legal requirement previous to any election call and sparking speculation that a regional election was imminent. Six days later, on 10 February, Urkullu confirmed the election for 5 April, seeking to distance himself from the convoluted political landscape in Catalonia after a 2020 election in the region was announced by Catalan president Quim Torra. The announcement of the Basque election prompted Galician president Alberto Núñez Feijóo to trigger a snap election in Galicia as well. However, on 16 March it was announced that the vote would be postponed for the duration of the COVID-19 pandemic in Spain, shortly after Prime Minister Pedro Sánchez's declaration of a nationwide lockdown in the country starting on the previous day.

Urkullu's Basque Nationalist Party (PNV) maintained its status as the largest party in the Basque Parliament with its best result since 1984, which coupled to an increase in support of one seat for the centre-left Socialist Party of the Basque Country–Basque Country Left (PSE-EE)—its coalition partner during the previous legislature—allowed Urkullu to establish a majority coalition government. The left-wing regional nationalist EH Bildu topped its best historical result, benefitting from the collapse of the United We Can–United Left (Elkarrekin Podemos) alliance, which lost nearly half its support. The PP+Cs alliance compromising both the People's Party (PP) and Citizens (Cs) lost roughly half of the seats won by the PP in the 2016 election, although Cs entered the regional parliament for the first time with 2 seats whereas the PP was allocated the alliance's remaining 4. The far-right Spanish unionist Vox entered the Parliament for the first time with one seat. Equo was not able to secure parliamentary representation after having won one seat as a member of the Elkarrekin Podemos alliance in 2016.

Overview

Electoral system
The Basque Parliament was the devolved, unicameral legislature of the autonomous community of the Basque Country, having legislative power in regional matters as defined by the Spanish Constitution of 1978 and the regional Statute of Autonomy, as well as the ability to vote confidence in or withdraw it from a lehendakari.

Voting for the Parliament was on the basis of universal suffrage, which comprised all nationals over 18 years of age, registered in the Basque Country and in full enjoyment of their political rights. Additionally, Basques abroad were required to apply for voting before being permitted to vote, a system known as "begged" or expat vote. The 75 members of the Basque Parliament were elected using the D'Hondt method and a closed list proportional representation, with an electoral threshold of three percent of valid votes—which included blank ballots—being applied in each constituency. Seats were allocated to constituencies, corresponding to the provinces of Álava, Biscay and Gipuzkoa, being allocated a fixed number of 25 seats each to provide for an equal representation of the three provinces in parliament as required under the regional statute of autonomy. This meant that Álava was allocated the same number of seats as Biscay and Gipuzkoa, despite their populations being, as of 1 January 2020, 329,857, 1,142,923 and 716,530, respectively.

The use of the D'Hondt method might result in a higher effective threshold, depending on the district magnitude.

Election date
The term of the Basque Parliament expired four years after the date of its previous election, unless it was dissolved earlier. The election decree was required to be issued no later than the twenty-fifth day prior to the date of expiry of parliament and published on the following day in the Official Gazette of the Basque Country (BOPV), with election day taking place on the fifty-fourth day from publication. The previous election was held on 25 September 2016, which meant that the legislature's term would have expired on 25 September 2020. The election decree was required to be published in the BOPV no later than 1 September 2020, with the election taking place on the fifty-fourth day from publication, setting the latest possible election date for the Parliament on Sunday, 25 October 2020.

The lehendakari had the prerogative to dissolve the Basque Parliament at any given time and call a snap election, provided that no motion of no confidence was in process. In the event of an investiture process failing to elect a lehendakari within a sixty-day period from the Parliament re-assembly, the Parliament was to be dissolved and a fresh election called.

On 4 February 2020, it was revealed that Iñigo Urkullu was considering holding a snap election within a short timeframe and that he had fulfilled legal requirements for it by raising such hypothesis within a cabinet meeting, with 5 April being regarded as the most likely date. The decision of Catalan president Quim Torra on 29 January to announce a snap Catalan regional election to be held at some point throughout 2020 was said to have raised concerns within Urkullu's government, as the Basque Nationalist Party (PNV) sought to prevent the next Basque regional election from being held simultaneously to prevent any interference from the Catalan political debate into the Basque campaign.

Asked in a plenary session of parliament on 7 February on whether he would be dissolving the chamber within the following days, Urkullu refused to either explicitly confirm or reject such hypothesis, but asked opposition parties for a commitment to approve as many legislation as possible "now and in the future". Sources within the Basque government pointed out that, for an election to be held on 5 April, the dissolution decree would have to be published in the BOPV on Tuesday, 11 February, and that if a snap election was to be eventually called the announcement of it happening could be delayed up to that day. Finally, Urkullu confirmed on 10 February the election date for 5 April, with the subsequent dissolution of parliament to be made official on the next day.

As a result of the COVID-19 pandemic, the election's original date was suspended on 16 March, with it being rescheduled for 12 July 2020 on 18 May after the easing of virus spreading conditions and a reduction in the infection rate, resulting in the lockdown established by the state of alarm lasting from 15 March to 21 June.

Parliamentary composition
The Basque Parliament was officially dissolved on 11 February 2020, after the publication of the dissolution decree in the Official Gazette of the Basque Country. The table below shows the composition of the parliamentary groups in the chamber at the time of dissolution.

Parties and candidates
The electoral law allowed for parties and federations registered in the interior ministry, coalitions and groupings of electors to present lists of candidates. Parties and federations intending to form a coalition ahead of an election were required to inform the relevant Electoral Commission within ten days of the election call, whereas groupings of electors needed to secure the signature of at least one percent of the electorate in the constituencies for which they sought election, disallowing electors from signing for more than one list of candidates.

Below is a list of the main parties and electoral alliances which contested the election:

In August 2018, Pilar Zabala, the leader of Elkarrekin Podemos, announced that she would not seek reelection and would leave politics by the end of the legislature. Ahead of the election, Equo was excluded from the coalition after the party had broken up with the Unidas Podemos nationwide alliance to join Más País in the lead up to the November 2019 Spanish general election.

Alfonso Alonso had been initially scheduled to repeat as the leading candidate for the People's Party (PP) in the regional election, having been confirmed for the post on 10 February 2020. However, the negotiation of a coalition with Citizens (Cs) which the Basque PP received with heavy criticism, amid claims of having been overruled and swept aside by the party's national leadership in the coalition talks, triggered an internal clash which led national PP leader Pablo Casado to force Alonso's removal as candidate on 23 February and propose Carlos Iturgaiz for the post instead.

Timetable
The key dates are listed below (all times are CET):

10 February: The election decree is issued with the countersign of the Lehendakari after deliberation in the Council of Government.
11 February: Formal dissolution of the Basque Parliament and beginning of a suspension period of events for the inauguration of public works, services or projects.
14 February: Initial constitution of historical territory and zone electoral commissions.
21 February: Deadline for parties and federations intending to enter into a coalition to inform the relevant electoral commission.
2 March: Deadline for parties, federations, coalitions, and groupings of electors to present lists of candidates to the relevant electoral commission.
4 March: Submitted lists of candidates are provisionally published in the Official Gazette of the Basque Country (BOPV).
7 March: Deadline for citizens entered in the Register of Absent Electors Residing Abroad (CERA) and for citizens temporarily absent from Spain to apply for voting.
8 March: Deadline for parties, federations, coalitions, and groupings of electors to rectify irregularities in their lists.
9 March: Official proclamation of valid submitted lists of candidates.
10 March: Proclaimed lists are published in the BOPV.
16 March: Urkullu announces the elections will be postponed due to the COVID-19 pandemic.

19 May: The election decree is newly issued with the countersign of the Lehendakari after deliberation in the Council of Government.
20 May: Beginning of a suspension period of events for the inauguration of public works, services or projects.
25 May: Initial constitution of historical territory and zone electoral commissions.
29 May: Deadline for parties and federations intending to enter into a coalition to inform the relevant electoral commission.
8 June: Deadline for parties, federations, coalitions, and groupings of electors to present lists of candidates to the relevant electoral commission.
10 June: Submitted lists of candidates are provisionally published in the BOPV.
13 June: Deadline for citizens entered in the CERA and for citizens temporarily absent from Spain to apply for voting.
14 June: Deadline for parties, federations, coalitions, and groupings of electors to rectify irregularities in their lists.
15 June: Official proclamation of valid submitted lists of candidates.
16 June: Proclaimed lists are published in the BOPV.
26 June: Official start of electoral campaigning.
2 July: Deadline to apply for postal voting.
7 July: Official start of legal ban on electoral opinion polling publication, dissemination or reproduction and deadline for CERA citizens to vote by mail.
8 July: Deadline for postal and temporarily absent voters to issue their votes.
10 July: Last day of official electoral campaigning and deadline for CERA citizens to vote in a ballot box in the relevant consular office or division.
11 July: Official 24-hour ban on political campaigning prior to the general election (reflection day).
12 July: Polling day (polling stations open at 9 am and close at 8 pm or once voters present in a queue at/outside the polling station at 8 pm have cast their vote). Provisional counting of votes starts immediately.
17 July: General counting of votes, including the counting of CERA votes.
21 July: Deadline for the general counting of votes to be carried out by the relevant electoral commission.
1 August: Deadline for elected members to be proclaimed by the relevant electoral commission.
7 August: Final deadline for definitive results to be published in the BOPV.
The parliament's re-assembly must take place within fifteen days following the accreditation of at least one-third of proclaimed legislators.

Campaign

Party slogans

Election debates

Opinion polls
The tables below list opinion polling results in reverse chronological order, showing the most recent first and using the dates when the survey fieldwork was done, as opposed to the date of publication. Where the fieldwork dates are unknown, the date of publication is given instead. The highest percentage figure in each polling survey is displayed with its background shaded in the leading party's colour. If a tie ensues, this is applied to the figures with the highest percentages. The "Lead" column on the right shows the percentage-point difference between the parties with the highest percentages in a poll.

Graphical summary

Voting intention estimates
The table below lists weighted voting intention estimates. Refusals are generally excluded from the party vote percentages, while question wording and the treatment of "don't know" responses and those not intending to vote may vary between polling organisations. When available, seat projections determined by the polling organisations are displayed below (or in place of) the percentages in a smaller font; 38 seats were required for an absolute majority in the Basque Parliament.

Voter turnout
The table below shows registered vote turnout on election day without including voters from the Census of Absent-Residents (CERA).

Results

Overall

Distribution by constituency

Aftermath

Notes

References
Opinion poll sources

Other

2020 in the Basque Country (autonomous community)
Basque Country
Basque Country
July 2020 events in Spain
Regional elections in the Basque Country (autonomous community)